Club Deportivo TACA  is a Salvadoran professional football club based in Oratorio de Concepción, Cuscatlán,  El Salvador.

The club currently plays in the Tercera Division de Fútbol Salvadoreño.

Former coaches
 Alberto Valle (2005)

References

Football clubs in El Salvador